The Fresh Water Fishing Hall of Fame is an American hall of fame in Hayward, Wisconsin, dedicated to promoting freshwater fishing. Approximately 100,000 visitors tour the museum each year. The  muskie sculpture is the world's largest muskie.

Museum
The hall of fame was founded in 1960, with buildings constructed in 1976. It is located on a  plot of land in Hayward near Wisconsin Highway 27, and it occupies  in seven buildings. One of the buildings is a  fiberglass sculpture of a jumping muskie fish. The lower jaw of the fish is an observation deck that has on occasion been used for weddings. The museum contains exhibitions of over 400 mounted fish, along with 300 outboard motors. The Hall of Fame also maintains records for the largest fresh water fish in the United States and the world.

Inductees
Individuals are inducted into the Hall of Fame in four categories: Enshrinement Programs, Fishing Guide Recognition, Legendary Anglers, and Organization Recognition. There have been 65 individuals inducted under the Enshrinement Program for their national and world impact on fresh water fishing, 78 as Legendary Anglers for their impact on at least a regional level, 15 for their work in the field as fishing guides, and 24 organizations for their contributions to the sport.

Notable inductees include Juliana Berners, Ole Evinrude, Virgil Ward, Izaak Walton, and baseball player Ted Williams, who was known for his fishing skill.

Gallery

See also
 List of Wisconsin fishing records

References

External links
Fresh Water Fishing Hall of Fame and Museum official website

Freshwater ecology
Recreational fishing in the United States
Sports halls of fame
Fish
Sports museums in Wisconsin
Museums in Sawyer County, Wisconsin
Awards established in 1960